Chirujallu is a 2001 Indian Telugu-language romance film directed by Sriram Balaji. The film stars Tarun, Richa, and S. P. Balasubrahmanyam in the lead roles. Music was composed by Vandemataram Srinivas. The film released on 17 August 2001. It was a box office failure.

Plot 
Vamsi is an orphan who is in love with Radhika, daughter of Durga Prasad, a businessman. They are due to get married soon. However, Vamsi suddenly goes missing, then he gets sent to jail and ends up in a mental asylum. The reasons behind Vamsi's missing and will he be able to unite with Radhika forms the rest of the story.

Cast 

 Tarun as Vamsi
 Richa Pallod as Radhika
 S. P. Balasubrahmanyam as Durga Prasad
 Brahmanandam
 Giri Babu
 M. S. Narayana
 Sana
 Ali
 Harsha Vardhan
 Siva Reddy

Soundtrack 
The soundtrack was composed by Vandemataram Srinivas.

References

External links
 

2000s Telugu-language films
2001 films
Films scored by Vandemataram Srinivas